12 de Octubre is a western department of Chaco Province in Argentina.

The provincial subdivision has a population of about 20,000 inhabitants in an area of  2,576 km2, and its capital city is General Pinedo, which is located around 1,060 km from the Capital federal.

Settlements

Gancedo
General Capdevila
General Pinedo

References

External links
General Pinedo Municipal Website (Spanish)

1912 establishments in Argentina
Departments of Chaco Province
Populated places established in 1912